The tenth season of Bad Girls Club is titled Bad Girls Club: Atlanta and premiered on January 15, 2013 and was filmed in Atlanta, Georgia. For this season, the show returned to the United States. Also, this is the fifth season to take place in a different location from Los Angeles, the first being season five (filmed in Miami), the second being season seven (filmed in New Orleans), the third being season eight (filmed in Las Vegas) and the fourth being season nine (filmed in Cabo San Lucas, Mexico).

House
The house was on North Druid Hills which is a few miles northeast of downtown Atlanta. The house was originally built for Fred Milani and was built as a replica of the White House. The exterior of the house was remodeled and included a pink roof and a Bad Girls Club logo above the door. Art directors who designed and furnished the house, Jeffrey Eyser and Alexis Karpf, said "We wanted to keep it very vintage, but modern". The walls were painted with brights colors. The backyard had a pool and the girls' pictures were tall standing cutouts and had long magnetic strips to stick to the cutouts. The in-house confessional had pink and purple stained glass windows in the background giving it a church "confess your sins" illusion. The walls of the living room had colorful crown molding scattered about. The kitchen had artificial grass flooring which bleeds into the hallway. The phone room was designed as a gazebo. The beauty room had a "Southern salon vibe" and had vintage chairs and a neon sign which read "BEAUTY ROOM". The house also had a stripper pole.

Cast 
The season began with seven original bad girls, of which two left voluntarily and one was removed by production. Three replacement bad girls were introduced in their absences later in the season.

Duration of Cast

Episodes

Notes

References

External links 

Bad Girls Club seasons
Television shows set in Atlanta
2013 American television seasons